Sticky may refer to:

People
Sticky (musician), alias of UK garage producer Richard Forbes
Sticky Fingaz or Sticky (born 1973), nickname of the US rapper and actor Kirk Jones

Adhesion
Adhesion, the tendency of dissimilar particles or surfaces to cling to one another
Sticky mat, an adhesive mat used in cleanrooms to lessen contamination from footwear
Sticky note, a generic term for a Post-it Note or competitor

Computing
Sticky bit, a user ownership access-right flag that can be assigned to files and directories on Unix systems
Sticky session, see Load balancing (computing)#Persistence
Sticky thread, an internet forum thread deemed important

Other uses
Sticky (album), a 2021 album by Frank Carter and the Rattlesnakes
"Sticky" (Drake song), 2022
"Sticky" (The Maine song), 2021
"Sticky", a 1993 song by the Wedding Present from the album Hit Parade 2
"Sticky", a 1995 song by Dance Hall Crashers from the album Lockjaw
"Sticky", a 2018 song by Ravyn Lenae from the EP Crush
"The Sticky", a 1999 song by Gruvis Malt from the album Sound Soldiers
Sticky (comics), a book of gay erotic comics
Sticky (economics), resistant to change

See also
Stick (disambiguation)
Stickies (disambiguation)
Sticky Fingers (disambiguation)